Castor is the second-brightest object in the zodiac constellation of Gemini. It has the Bayer designation α Geminorum, which is Latinised to Alpha Geminorum and abbreviated Alpha Gem or α Gem. With an apparent visual magnitude of 1.93, it is one of the brightest stars in the night sky. Castor appears singular to the naked eye, but it is actually a sextuple star system organized into three binary pairs. Although it is the 'α' (alpha) member of the constellation, it is fainter than 'β' (beta) Geminorum, Pollux.

Stellar system 
Hierarchy of orbits in the Castor system

Castor is a multiple star system made up of six individual stars; there are three visual components, all of which are spectroscopic binaries. Appearing to the naked eye as a single star, Castor was first recorded as a double star in 1718 by James Pound, but it may have been resolved into at least two sources of light by Cassini as early as 1678. The separation between the binary systems Castor A and Castor B has increased from about 2″ (2 arcseconds of angular measurement) in 1970 to about 6″ in 2017. These pairs have magnitudes of 1.9 and 3.0, respectively.

Castor Aa and Ba both have orbits of a few days with a much fainter companion.

Castor C, or YY Geminorum, was discovered to vary in brightness with a regular period. It is an eclipsing binary with additional variations due to areas of different brightness on the surface of one or both stars, as well as irregular flares. The Castor C components orbit in less than a day. Castor C is believed to be in orbit around Castor AB, but with an extremely long period of several thousand years. It is 73″ distant from the bright components.

The combined apparent magnitude of all six stars is +1.58.

Physical properties 
Castor is 51 light-years away from Earth, determined from its large annual parallax.

The two brightest stars are both A-class main-sequence stars, more massive and brighter than the Sun. The properties of their red dwarf companions are difficult to determine, but are both thought to have less than half the mass of the Sun.

Castor B is an Am star, with particularly strong spectral lines of certain metals.

Castor C is a variable star, classified as a BY Draconis type. BY Draconis variables are cool dwarf stars which vary as they rotate due to starspots or other variations in their photospheres.

All the red dwarfs in the Castor system have emissions lines in their spectra, and all are flare stars.

Etymology and culture
α Geminorum (Latinised to Alpha Geminorum) is the star system's Bayer designation.

Castor and Pollux are the two "heavenly twin" stars that give the constellation Gemini (meaning twins in Latin) its name. The name Castor refers specifically to Castor, one of the twin sons of Zeus and Leda in Greek and Roman mythology.

The star was annotated by the Arabic description Al Ras al Taum al Muqadim, which translates as the head of the foremost twin. In the catalogue of stars in the Calendarium of al Achsasi al Mouakket, this star was designated Aoul al Dzira, which was translated into Latin as Prima Brachii, meaning the first in the paw.

In 2016, the International Astronomical Union organized a Working Group on Star Names (WGSN) to catalog and standardize proper names for stars. The WGSN's first bulletin of July 2016 included a table of the first two batches of names approved by the WGSN; which included Castor for the star α Geminorum Aa.

Castor C also has the variable star designation YY Geminorum.

See also
 List of brightest stars
 List of nearest bright stars
 Historical brightest stars

References

External links
 

 

A-type main-sequence stars
M-type main-sequence stars
Flare stars
BY Draconis variables
6
Castor Moving Group

Geminorum, Alpha
2891
BD+32 1581
Geminorum, 66
Gemini (constellation)
060178 9
036850
Geminorum, YY
Castor
Emission-line stars